Grouse are a group of birds from the order Galliformes.

Grouse may also refer to:

Military
 USS Grouse, several US Navy ships
 9K38 Igla, a Russian/Soviet surface-to-air missile, by NATO reporting name
 Operation Grouse (disambiguation), several military operations during the Second World War

Places
 Grouse Mountain, Canada
 Grouse Mountain (California), U.S.
 Grouse Mountain, two mountains in Gallatin County, Montana, US; see List of mountains in Gallatin County, Montana 
 Grouse Creek (British Columbia), a creek in Canada
 Grouse Creek (Humboldt County, California), a creek in Humboldt County, California, U.S.
 Grouse Creek (Placer County, California), a creek in Placer County, California, U.S.

Other uses
 Toyama Grouses, a Japanese basketball team
 Grouse a podcast hosted by Ashley Ahearn